The Drama Desk Award for Outstanding Actor in a Musical is an annual award presented by Drama Desk in recognition of achievements in the theatre among Broadway, Off Broadway and Off-Off Broadway productions. The awards were established in 1955, with acting awards being given without making distinctions between roles in plays and musicals, or actors and actresses. The new award categories were later created in the 1975 ceremony.

Winners and nominees

1970s

1980s

1990s

2000s

2010s

2020s

Multiple wins

 3 wins
 Nathan Lane

 2 wins
 Danny Burstein
 Norbert Leo Butz
 Brent Carver

See also
 Laurence Olivier Award for Best Actor in a Musical
 Tony Award for Best Actor in a Musical

References
 
  2002 New York Times article

External links
 Drama Desk official website

Musical Actor
Awards for male actors
Theatre acting awards